Evangelical Theological Seminary, now Evangelical Seminary, is a graduate school in Myerstown, Pennsylvania, USA.

Evangelical Theological Seminary may also refer to:
Garrett–Evangelical Theological Seminary, a graduate school in Evanston, Illinois, USA

Evangelical School of Theology, a former seminary of the Evangelical Church that merged into United Theological Seminary in 1954

See also
Evangelical School of Smyrna (1733-1922), a Greek secondary school
Evangelical Seminaries of Maulbronn and Blaubeuren in Germany